Calvary Cemetery is a Roman Catholic cemetery in Cleveland, Ohio, in the United States. The cemetery straddles the border between Cleveland and the city of Garfield Heights, with its offices within the city limits of Cleveland. Calvary Cemetery is the largest Catholic cemetery in Cleveland, and one of the largest in Ohio.

About the cemetery

The cost of the land was $600 ($ in  dollars). Formerly the Leand farm, it was named Calvary Cemetery. Toledo cemetery designer, horticulturist, and cemetery superintendent Frank Eurich designed Calvary as a lawn cemetery. The land was regraded and other initial improvements made by The William H. Evers Engineering Company. Calvary Cemetery was consecrated on November 26, 1893.

Within just a few years, the cemetery featured a stone receiving vault, waiting room at the entrance, and a number of roads. A streetcar spur ran adjacent to the cemetery, allowing caskets and funeral parties to reach the cemetery by electric train.

Initially, the cemetery was bounded on its east side by the Connotton Valley Railway, whose tracks were laid in 1882. An additional purchase of land east of the railroad tracks was made in 1900. Fifty acres appears to be the best figure, and is supported by an industry trade journal which reported the cemetery's total size as a total  in 1900. The cemetery acquired the  Quigley farm and the  Stegkemper tract in 1910. The streetcar line was torn up in 1947, and the  strip of land sold to the cemetery for $600 ($ in  dollars).

As of 2007, there were over 305,000 interments at Calvary Cemetery. The first burials, of John and Catharine Hogan, were on November 30, 1893. Husband and wife, they died one day apart and were buried in section 10. The largest number of burials occurred on November 4, 1918, during the Spanish flu pandemic. There were 81 burials that day. The total number of interments that month was 985. The cemetery contains the Commonwealth war graves of two World War I soldiers of the Canadian Army.

Calvary Cemetery is the largest Catholic cemetery in Cleveland, and operated by the Catholic Cemeteries Association.

Memorials
A large memorial angel atop a pedestal inscribed "Our Babies" was dedicated on November 2, 1952, in what is now section 105 of the cemetery. This section was then set aside for the burial of infants and children. The news media did not identify the sculptor or manufacturer.

In 1966, the cemetery opened a new section (now identified as Section 43) near the E. 100th Street entrance. This section was dedicated to in-ground, flat headstones typical of lawn cemeteries. Overlooking the section, the cemetery constructed a grotto and placed a life-size terracotta statue of Christ in the niche. The manufacturer of the statue was not identified by the press.

A statue of Our Lady, Queen of Heaven was erected at the E. 100th Street entrance of Calvary Cemetery in 2001. The statue was paid for by the Lausche Foundation and dedicated to the memory Senator Frank Lausche.

After the Diocese of Cleveland closed or merged more than 75 parishes between 2006 and 2010, several works of art were moved to Calvary Cemetery. After St. Hyacinth Church closed in September 2009, its monument to Catholic war veterans was moved to the entrance of Calvary Cemetery. St. Margaret of Hungary Church originally was located in Cleveland's Buckeye–Shaker neighborhood. In 1960, parishioners erected a life-size statuary group to honor church members who had died in World War II. The group featured a crucified Christ, three women, and two angels. The sculptures were set on brick and concrete pedestals, with a bronze plaque attached to the main pedestal. When St. Margaret of Hungary Church moved to Orange, Ohio, in 1989, the statue group was relocated as well. The church closed in November 2009, and the diocese removed the statuary group a month later. Initially, the diocese intended to disperse the statuary group among several cemeteries. After months of discussion with former St. Margaret parishioners, the diocese agreed to reinstall the complete grouping near the cemetery's 116th Street entrance, where many World War II dead are buried. The cost of the installation was $30,000 ($ in  dollars), and the memorial rededicated in mid-September 2010.

Notable interments
Frank J. Battisti (1922–1994), judge for the Northern District of Ohio.
Gene Carroll (1897–1972), actor, musician, comedian, and host of the long-running local television series The Gene Carroll Show.
Kathleen Daly Chapman McMahon (1893–1926), and Rae Marie Chapman (1921–1929), the widow and daughter (respectively) of Ray Chapman. Chapman is the only Major League Baseball player to die as the result of being hit by a pitched ball. Kathleen and Rae are buried together.
Michael Corcoran (d. 1919), Medal of Honor recipient, Indian Wars.
Ed Delahanty (1867–1903), Hall of Fame baseball player.
Danny Greene (1933–1977), mobster
Anton Grdina (1874–1957), community activist, first American to receive Yugoslavia's highest civil honor (Third Order of the Crown).
Frank Lausche (1895–1990), Cleveland mayor and Ohio governor.
Angelo Lonardo (1911–2006), underboss of the Cleveland Mafia
Joseph Lonardo (1884–1927), boss of the Cleveland Mafia
Helena Pelczar (1888–1926), Catholic stigmatist with an open beatification process.
John R. Towle (1924–1944), U.S. Army World War II Medal of Honor recipient.
Stanisława Walasiewicz (Stella Walsh) (1911–1980), controversial Olympic gold medalist.
Bill Wambsganss (1894–1985), baseball player who made the only unassisted triple play in World Series history.
Frankie Yankovic (1915–1998), musician known as "The Polka King".
Antanas Smetona (1874–1944), first President of Lithuania.

References
Notes

Citations

Bibliography

External links

1893 establishments in Ohio
Cemeteries in Cleveland
Roman Catholic cemeteries in Ohio
 
Garfield Heights, Ohio